I'm Just Wild About Jerry is a 1965 Tom and Jerry short directed and produced by Chuck Jones. Jones wrote the plot with Michael Maltese, while animation was by Dick Thompson, Ben Washam, Ken Harris and Don Towsley. The title's a play-on-words of the popular 1920s song "I'm Just Wild About Harry". Jones had also used the pun for Wild About Hurry with Wile E. Coyote and the Road Runner.

Plot
Tom chases Jerry down many flights of stairs down of a high-rise while the credits roll. They both make it to the ground and continue the pursuit. Tom almost catches the mouse, but Jerry sees a roller skate just ahead uses it to roll down the pavement, getting way ahead of Tom. Jerry hides behind a wall and pushes the roller skate out. Tom steps on it and rolls onto train tracks, where a train is approaching him fast. Tom blindfolds himself and the train runs over him. Jerry runs towards and through a mail slot. Tom revives himself, only to be run over by a second train.

Jerry paces into a large department store. Tom pops in through the mail slot formed into a package shape and then runs after the mouse, but Tom's tail is hooked onto the slot. Jerry runs around a pillar and Tom runs to the side of it. He sees his super-stretched tail and then he is pulled back into the door making his tail coiled up in long lengths and then sees the end of his tail hooked up to the mail slot. Tom comically grins and ties his tail around himself and hops away, but is soon confronted with Jerry driving a toy noise-making fire truck. Tom clutches the ceiling in fear until he sees Jerry waving at him. The cat slides down and sees the controls for the trucks.

Tom causes the fire truck to back up (thus losing its bell, ladder, and light accouterments in the process, while still retaining its siren), launch forward and throw the mouse off it, and then draw back once again and prepare to ram the mouse. Jerry barely keeps up with the fire truck and Tom periodically stops the truck to "allow" Jerry time to breathe, but he is only taunting his rival. Tom then fiddles with the controls some more and the truck jumps to life, steps forward on its wheels, and tries to devour the rodent. The truck then chases Jerry across the floor until Jerry ascends a fixture and drops a bowling ball towards the truck. It scampers away in fear and the bowling ball rolls onto an escalator.

The bowling ball ascends to the second floor and bumps an oscillating statue, which bumps a china pot down onto where Tom is sitting. Tom looks up, sees the pot, then stands up and catches it at the last second. However, the bowling ball also falls off the balcony, and it crashes through the pot and onto Tom's head. A lump then grows from the cat's head and emerges through one of the holes in the bowling ball.

Jerry descends and hides in the next room where Tom sees a whole display of toy mice that look just like Jerry. Tom pulls their tails, causing four fake Jerrys to exclaim, "Mama!" until the real Jerry yelps. With an "A-HA!" (provided by Chuck Jones), Tom then takes the mouse and plays ping-pong with Jerry by himself. Eventually, Jerry stretches the net across to the other side and grabs a croquet mallet before he is shot back at the cat. Tom prepares to dash to the other side and then sees the mallet approaching and gets launched back on impact. Jerry uses the fire truck to speed across the floor and open a pipe so that Tom squeezes through it. The cat snakes through the plumbing and comes out in the shape of a cylinder. He then is ejected into the opening elevator doors, falling down the shaft until he meets a spring placed by Jerry, and bounces off it and through the mail slot.

Tom rolls back out onto the train tracks, and a third train approaches the cat. By this time, he manages to blindfold himself and prepare for the inevitable. However, at the last second, the train speeds past him harmlessly. It is shown that Jerry saved Tom by switching the points. For his kind-hearted act of saving his rival, Jerry grows a halo and a pair of angel's wings and then flies out of sight into the moonlight.

Crew
Story: Michael Maltese & Chuck Jones
Animation: Dick Thompson, Ben Washam, Ken Harris, & Don Towsley.
Backgrounds: Philip DeGuard
Vocal Effects: Mel Blanc, June Foray, Chuck Jones & William Hanna
In Charge of Production: Les Goldman
Co-Director & Layouts: Maurice Noble
Music: Eugene Poddany
Produced & Directed by Chuck Jones

External links

Tom and Jerry short films
1965 animated films
1965 films
1965 short films
1960s animated short films
Short films directed by Chuck Jones
Films directed by Maurice Noble
Films scored by Eugene Poddany
Films set in department stores
1960s American animated films
1965 comedy films
Animated films without speech
Metro-Goldwyn-Mayer short films
Metro-Goldwyn-Mayer animated short films
MGM Animation/Visual Arts short films
Films with screenplays by Michael Maltese